Minute ventilation (or respiratory minute volume or minute volume) is the volume of gas inhaled (inhaled minute volume) or exhaled (exhaled minute volume) from a person's lungs per minute. It is an important parameter in respiratory medicine due to its relationship with blood carbon dioxide levels. It can be measured with devices such as a Wright respirometer or can be calculated from other known respiratory parameters. Although minute volume can be viewed as a unit of volume, it is usually treated in practice as a flow rate (given that it represents a volume change over time).  Typical units involved are (in metric) 0.5 L × 12 breaths/min = 6 L/min.

Several symbols can be used to represent minute volume. They include  (V̇ or V-dot) or Q (which are general symbols for flow rate),  MV, and VE.

Determination of minute volume 
Minute volume can either be measured directly or calculated from other known parameters.

Measurement of minute volume 
Minute volume is the amount of gas inhaled or exhaled from a person's lungs in one minute. It can be measured by a Wright respirometer or other device capable of cumulatively measuring gas flow, such as mechanical ventilators.

Calculation of minute volume 
If both tidal volume (VT) and respiratory rate (ƒ or RR) are known, minute volume can be calculated by multiplying the two values. One must also take care to consider the effect of dead space on alveolar ventilation, as seen below in "Relationship to other physiological rates".

Physiological significance of minute volume 
Blood carbon dioxide (PaCO2) levels generally vary inversely with minute volume. For example, a person with increased minute volume (e.g. due to hyperventilation) should demonstrate a lower blood carbon dioxide level. The healthy human body will alter minute volume in an attempt to maintain physiologic homeostasis. A normal minute volume while resting is about 5–8 liters per minute in humans. Minute volume generally decreases when at rest, and increases with exercise. For example, during light activities minute volume may be around 12 litres. Riding a bicycle increases minute ventilation by a factor of 2 to 4 depending on the level of exercise involved. Minute ventilation during moderate exercise may be between 40 and 60 litres per minute.

Hyperventilation is the term for having a minute ventilation higher than physiologically appropriate. Hypoventilation describes a minute volume less than physiologically appropriate.

Relationship to other physiological rates 
Minute volume comprises the sum of alveolar ventilation and dead space ventilation. That is:

where  is alveolar ventilation, and  represents dead space ventilation.

References

External links 
 Overview at healthsystem.virginia.edu
 

Respiratory physiology